is a passenger railway station in the city of Chōshi, Chiba Japan, operated by the East Japan Railway Company (JR East).

Lines

Station layout
The station consists of dual opposed side platforms connected to the station building by a footbridge. The station is unattended.

Platforms

History
Saruda Station was opened on 25 January 1898 as a station on the Sōbu Railway for both passenger and freight operations. On 1 September 1907, the Sōbu Railway was nationalised, becoming part of the Japanese Government Railway (JGR). After World War II, the JGR became the Japan National Railways (JNR). Scheduled freight operations were suspended from 1 October 1962. The station was absorbed into the JR East network upon the privatization of the Japan National Railways (JNR) on 1 April 1987. The station building was partially reconstructed in January 2007.

Passenger statistics
In fiscal 2006, the station was used by an average of 240 passengers daily

Surrounding area
 Chiba Prefectural Road No. 71 Choshi Asahi Line
 Chiba Prefectural Road 211 Iioka Saruta Stop Line
 Saruda Shrine

See also
 List of railway stations in Japan

References

External links

 JR East station information 

Railway stations in Japan opened in 1898
Railway stations in Chiba Prefecture
Sōbu Main Line
Chōshi